Selkent (an acronym of South East London & Kent) is a bus company operating in central and south London and some parts of north-west Kent. It is a subsidiary brand of Stagecoach London and operates services under contract to Transport for London. The brand is not publicly used since 2010 as all buses are branded as Stagecoach, but it exists as a legal entity.

Selkent shares its headquarters with sister company East London at West Ham.

History

Selkent began as an operating district of London Transport in the early 1980s. On 1 April 1989, London Buses was divided into 11 separate business units, one of which was Selkent.

Selkent was the first London Buses subsidiary to completely cease operation of AEC Routemasters, in March 1992, when the Catford garage allocation on route 36B was converted to driver-only-operated buses.

In September 1994, Selkent was sold to Stagecoach and renamed Stagecoach Selkent. In November 2000, Stagecoach consolidated its London operations under the Stagecoach London brand.

In August 2006, Stagecoach sold its London bus operations to Macquarie Bank. The new owner restored the Selkent name and logo. In October 2010 Stagecoach reacquired its old London operations with Selkent once again rebranded as Stagecoach London.

Livery
Between 1988 and 1994 Selkent, along with the other London Buses subsidiaries, used a red livery with a grey skirt. Following privatisation, Selkent adopted an all-red livery. In November 2000, Stagecoach introduced a new standard livery of white with a dark blue skirt and orange and light blue swirls at the rear. For Selkent (and East London), the white was replaced by red, to conform with a contractual requirement for London buses to be 80% red. After the sale to Macquarie Bank, an all-red livery was reintroduced.

Garages
Selkent operates three bus garages.

Bromley (TB)

As of 2022, Bromley garage operates routes 61, 146, 246, 314, 336, 638, and B14. Starting in September 2022, Stagecoach Bromley will operate school bus route 684, previously run by the Orpington based Go Ahead Group.

History
Bromley garage was opened by the London General Omnibus Company in April 1924. Built at a cost of £23,000, it was originally designed to house 60 buses, although the plan was to ultimately enlarge it to take an additional 40 when operations required it. Under an agreement reached with Thomas Tilling, the garage was allocated to the latter's use, along with Croydon and Lewisham, resulting in Tilling-type vehicles being the mainstay of the fleet until 1949, when the final petrol-engined STL-type double deckers were finally superseded. This was made possible by the hire of 17 AEC Regents from Leeds City Transport.

Between 1972 and 1979, Daimler Fleetlines joined the AEC Regent III RTs, running alongside them. AEC Routemasters were not introduced to Bromley until 1975, being replaced in 1984 by Leyland Titans. With regards to single-deckers, Bromley first housed RF-class AEC Regal IVs, arriving in 1952, which were gradually replaced by AEC Swifts between 1968 and 1971. FS-class Ford Transit minibuses were introduced in 1972 for local route B1, before these were replaced in 1976 by BS-class Bristol LHSs. These were in turn replaced by longer, BL-class Bristol LHs in 1978. In 1977 Leyland Nationals replaced the last of the SMSs, and ran alongside the BLs until 1985, when Bromley became the domain of Nationals and Titans.

In the early 1990s, the Nationals were replaced by Carlyle bodied Dennis Darts and MCW/Optare MetroRider midibuses. After the takeover by Stagecoach, some of the Titans were replaced by Volvo Olympians, before the fleet at Bromley began to be standardised on the Dennis Trident 2 and the Dennis Dart SLF. In slightly more recent years, a plot of land on the opposite side of the side road (Lower Gravel Road) was developed into an open yard for storage of the larger number of generally longer, taller, wider vehicles required for today's operations.

Catford (TL)
As of January 2019, Catford garage operated routes 47, 54, 75, 124, 136, 160, 199, 273, 380, 621, 660, N199 and P4.

History
Catford Garage was opened in 1914 by the London General Omnibus Company, but was requisitioned a year later and did not re-open until 1920 when Thomas Tilling's Lewisham operation moved there due to space constraints at his other garage. Originally coded L, for Lewisham, it was changed to TL in 1924 to avoid confusion with Loughton.

Thomas Tilling gained an agreement in 1923 to double the size of Catford and to open a new garage in Bromley to cope with the new housing estates that were springing up around the area. The roof has had to be raised twice, first in 1930 to enable double deck buses to use the garage and again in 1948 to accommodate AEC Regent III RTs.

By 1954 Catford was operating some 194 RTs, the last leaving in 1978. Catford has done considerably better than most garages in numbers over the years, especially since de-regulation, having an allocation of 122 buses in 1994 rising to around 160 in the early 2000s.

Plumstead (PD)

As of October 2021, Plumstead garage operated routes 53, 96, 122, 161, 177, 180, 422, 472, 601, 602 and 672.

History
Plumstead is well sited to serve the growing Thamesmead area, and was built in 1981 to replace the existing Plumstead and Abbey Wood garages and was intended to be called Thamesmead. Built to hold 185 buses, when opened in 1981 it had an allocation entirely made up of MCW Metropolitans. By 1983, the garage had changed entirely to Leyland Titans, which by 1985 had begun to be phased out in favour of new Leyland Olympians.  The garage was home to 35 Mercedes-Benz Citaro articulated buses that worked on route 453 between March 2003 and April 2008.

Fleet
As at September 2014, East London had a peak vehicle requirement of 405 buses.

References

External links

Stagecoach London website

London bus operators
Stagecoach Group bus operators in England
1989 establishments in England